Cordylanthus wrightii, or Wright's birdbeak, is an annual plant in the family Orobanchaceae found in the Colorado Plateau and Canyonlands region of the southwestern United States.

References

wrightii